The men's C-1 1000 metres event was an open-style, individual canoeing event conducted as part of the Canoeing at the 1992 Summer Olympics program.

Medallists

Results

Heats
19 competitors were entered. The top three finishers in each heat moved on to the semifinals with the others relegated to the repechages.

Repechages
The top four finishers in each repechage and the fastest fifth-place finisher moved on to the semifinals.

Semifinals
The top four finishers in each semifinal and the fastest fifth-place finisher advanced to the final.

Neither Liljedahl nor Tikerpe's disqualifications were disclosed in the official report.

Final
The final took place on August 8.

Bukhalov used the same tactics to defeat Klementjevs like he did Michał Śliwiński in the C-1 500 m event the previous day. Bukhalov led from start to finish while Klemenjevs moved from fifth to second in the last 250 meters.

References
1992 Summer Olympics official report Volume 5. pp. 144–5. 
Sports-reference.com 1992 C-1 1000 m results.
Wallechinsky, David and Jaime Loucky (2008). "Canoeing: Men's Canadian Singles 1000 Meters". In The Complete Book of the Olympics: 2008 Edition. London: Aurum Press, Limited. pp. 480–1.

Men's C-1 1000
Men's events at the 1992 Summer Olympics